The Brinkerhoff-Demarest House is located in Teaneck, Bergen County, New Jersey, United States. The house was built in 1735 by Hendricks Brinkerhoff. The house was added to the National Register of Historic Places on January 10, 1983.

See also 

 National Register of Historic Places listings in Bergen County, New Jersey

References

Houses completed in 1735
Houses on the National Register of Historic Places in New Jersey
Houses in Bergen County, New Jersey
National Register of Historic Places in Bergen County, New Jersey
Teaneck, New Jersey
New Jersey Register of Historic Places